Wellington Water Limited is an infrastructure asset management company that manages the drinking water, wastewater and stormwater services of the councils in the Wellington Region of New Zealand.

Ownership and governance
The company was first incorporporated as Wellington Water Management Limited on 9 July 2003. The name was changed to Capacity Infrastructure Services Limited in July 2009, and in September 2014 the name was changed to Wellington Water Limited, when Capacity Infrastructure was merged with the water supply group of Greater Wellington Regional Council.

The South Wairarapa District Council transferred the management of their water infrastructure to Wellington Water, as from 1 October 2019.

Wellington Water manages the three waters assets owned by five councils including Hutt, Porirua, Upper Hutt and Wellington City councils, South Wairarapa District Council plus Greater Wellington Regional Council.  Wellington Water is jointly owned by all six councils, but the individual councils retain ownership of their assets, and set their own rates and user charges.

Each council is represented on a regional Wellington Water Committee that provides overall leadership and direction for the company. The Chairman of the Wellington Water Committee from its establishment in 2014 was Hutt City Councillor David Bassett.  In March 2021, Bassett announced his intention to step down from the role.  The mayor of Hutt City, Campbell Barry, took over the role of representing Hutt City on the Wellington Water Committee in May 2021.

Governance of Wellington Water Limited is provided by a board of independent directors. Geoff Dangerfield became a director of Wellington Water in 2017 and took on the role of Chair in 2020.  He resigned in October 2021, and Lynda Carroll who had been appointed to the Board in June 2021 then took over the role of Chair.

In June 2021, Wellington City Council (WCC) announced the resignation of the council's chief infrastructure officer, Tom Williams. This role was responsible for the working relationship between WCC and Wellington Water.  Williams was originally appointed after an independent report commissioned by the WCC chief executive in December 2019 found that the relationship between the two entities was lacking trust, and that the management services agreement had remained unsigned for over three years. In a comment about Williams resignation, the WCC chief executive said that Williams had "built a strong working relationship with Wellington Water."

Asset condition and service performance

The challenges for Wellington Water in managing the three waters include the deteriorated condition of pipelines in the Wellington metropolitan area. The pipelines are in significantly worse condition than those in other large networks nationwide, and there has been a recent history of serious failures. The water supply to the region is also at significant risk during a severe earthquake, although some projects are underway to improve resilience.

In March 2021, a Director of Wellington Water stated that the company was in dangerous spiral, where the pressure on resources caused by continuing failures was taking funding away from new investment.  Councils who are part owners of Wellington Water are increasing the funding for three waters in their Long Term Plans.  However, concerns have been raised about the ability of the local resources to deliver an increased volume of work.

Water supplies to the Wellington metropolitan area meet the requirements of the Health Act and conform with drinking water standards. However, for some of the towns in the Kapiti Coast and Wairarapa regions, there have been occasional non-conformances with the required standards for drinking water quality and safety.

Performance targets
In December 2019, a report to the Wellington City Council revealed that Wellington Water was failing to meet performance targets for response times to urgent callouts, and that it required $600,000 of additional operating funding to clear a backlog of leak repairs.

In February 2020, Wellington Water reported to Wellington City Council that it was not meeting its annual performance targets.  It had already failed to meet targets for sewage overflows into the harbour, E coli contamination and callout response times. As one example, the average response time to urgent call outs was eight hours – twice the target of four hours. Wellington Water called for a 30 year programme of investment, and suggested that performance targets be relaxed. The Mayor Andy Foster, said any suggestion to lower targets was rejected.

In December 2020, Audit New Zealand criticised Wellington Water for weaknesses in their non-financial performance indicators, including inability to accurately report the number of complaints about water supply, stormwater or wastewater, or accurately report the number of dry weather sewage overflows.   In one twelve month period, there were 2096 reported overflows of wastewater across the network against a target of less than 100. In March 2022, Wellington Water revealed that on average, it took 91 hours to respond to sewage overflows, against a target of 1 hour.

Management of large projects
A $10million increase in the forecast cost of the Omāroro reservoir was reported in June 2020, bringing the new total to almost $70million. Wellington City Councillors expressed concern about the ability of Wellington Water to manage a project of such a large scale. The council required an independent engineer to sit on Wellington Waters' Major Projects board, and report back to the council.

Industry reform

On 28 January 2020, the Minister of Local Government, Hon Nanaia Mahuta, released Cabinet papers and minutes setting out intentions for reform of service delivery and funding arrangements for the three waters services nationwide. The Cabinet paper referred to two key challenges of affordability and capability that are facing New Zealand's three waters service delivery. There was specific reference to Wellington Water as an example of one approach to service delivery that had successfully built capability through the scale of operations.  However, the paper also noted that Wellington Water has no ability to make trade-offs between operating and capital expenditure, nor can it cross-subsidise between owners or ratepayers in different districts.

In April 2022, the Chairperson of the Wellington Water Committee, Lower Hutt mayor Campbell Barry, expressed concerns that Wellington Water was at significant risk of losing staff during the transition to the planned "Entity C" that would have responsibility for the region from Marlborough up to Gisborne, under the Three Waters Reforms.  It is expected that by mid-2024, the people employed by Wellington Water, and the asset knowledge held by the business will have transitioned to the new entity.

Criticisms

Public relations costs
In March 2020, following a period of multiple issues with failures leading to sewage contamination of Wellington harbour, beaches and waterways,  Wellington Water engaged an international public relations company SweenyVesty to help improve its community engagement and consultation. In June 2020, there was criticism from a city councillor that Wellington Water had engaged a market research company Colmar Brunton to gather feedback from stakeholders. However, the Chair of the committee overseeing Wellington Water defended the expenditure on the grounds that the annual survey provides quantitative data for performance measures for the company and provides feedback to help the company improve. In the 12 months to December 2020, Wellington Water spent over $350,000 on external public relations and communications consultants.

Fluoridation failure 
In March 2022, Wellington Water revealed that there had been a prolonged failure of fluoridation equipment at water treatment plants owned by Greater Wellington Regional Council at Te Marua and Gear Island. It initially stated that there had been no fluoridation of water for a month, but later admitted that there had been no fluoride in the water from one of the region’s water treatment plants since May 2021 and from another plant since November 2021.  There was widespread criticism, and Wellington Water announced it would be holding an independent inquiry into the cause of the failures and why it had provided misleading information.

See also
 Water supply and sanitation in the Wellington region
 Water supply and sanitation in New Zealand
 Infrastructure asset management
 Water supply network
 Wastewater
 Stormwater

References

External links
 Wellington Water

Wellington Region
Water supply and sanitation in New Zealand
Infrastructure in New Zealand
Companies based in Wellington